Stylotermitidae is a family of termites in the order Blattodea. There are two extinct and one extant genera in Stylotermitidae, with more than 50 described species.

Genera
These three genera belong to the family Stylotermitidae:
 Stylotermes Holmgren, 1917
 † Parastylotermes Snyder & Emerson, 1949
 † Prostylotermes Engel & Grimaldi, 2011

References

Further reading

 

Termites
Blattodea families